Michael Szameit (1950 – 30 May 2014) was a German science fiction writer.

Born 1950 in Priessen (now part of Doberlug-Kirchhain), in East Germany, he became an electrician before beginning to study physics, which he had to abandon for health reasons. Later he worked as a sound technician, eventually becoming head of a recording studio for radio and television. From 1981 to 1984 he worked in the editorial office of the Neues Leben publishing house.

In 1984 he became a freelance writer. Today he lives in Hamburg and works as an editor and journalist for the German magazine Blinker.

His first short story was published 1976, his first novel (Red Alert in Tunnel Transterra) in 1982 by the Neues Leben publishing house.

According to a poll held in 1990 by the club magazine Transfer of the SFC Andymon, he was at that point one of the four most popular science fiction writers in the then German Democratic Republic.

Bibliography
None of his works has been published in English, so the titles are literal translations.

novels
 Red Alert in Tunnel Transterra (1982, Alarm im Tunnel Transterra)
 In the Light of Zaurak (1983, Im Glanz der Sonne Zaurak)
 The Secret of the Sun Stones (1984, Das Geheimnis der Sonnensteine)
 Dragoncruiser Ikaros (1987, Drachenkreuzer Ikaros; 1994 reprint by Heyne )
 Copyworld (1997; 1999 reprinted by Das Neue Berlin )

stories
 The Animal (1976, Das Tier)
 Vacation, Aldebaran style (1976, Urlaub auf aldebaranisch)
 The Apple-purée Cruiser (1983, Der Apfelmuskreuzer)
 Planet of the Wind Harps (1983, Planet der Windharfen)
 Three-Eyes, keep watch... (1990, Dreiäuglein, wache...)

as publisher
 From the Diary of an Ant (1985, Aus dem Tagebuch einer Ameise)
 The Long Way to the Blue Star (1990, Der lange Weg zum blauen Stern)

References

External links
unless otherwise noted they are all in German
 Official Website
 Michael Szameit @ Blinker
 Michael Szameit @ Epilog
 Michael Szameit @ SF-Autor.de

1950 births
2014 deaths
People from Doberlug-Kirchhain
Science fiction editors
German science fiction writers
German male short story writers
German short story writers
East German writers
Writers from Brandenburg
German male novelists
20th-century German novelists
20th-century German short story writers
20th-century German male writers